17 Hertz Studio was a  recording studio complex in Los Angeles, California originally established in 1972 as One on One Recording.

Background
Jim David (son of lyricist Hal David) founded One on One Recording in 1972 in the site of a former 1950s department store in North Hollywood.

The studio was popular for having the "best drum sound in Los Angeles" and was highly recognized for recording Metallica's 16× platinum self-titled album Metallica, also known as the Black Album. The studio was featured in Metallica's 1992 documentary, A Year and a Half in the Life of Metallica.

Notable albums recorded at this location include Metallica's Black Album, Metallica's ...And Justice for All, The Ritual by Testament, Awake by Dream Theater, When The Pawn... by Fiona Apple, Crazy Nights and Psycho Circus  by Kiss, and Dirt by Alice in Chains. Rust in Peace by Megadeth, was also mixed here.

In 1993, news about the studio piqued the interest of Japanese rock musician Yoshiki Hayashi, drummer of heavy metal band X Japan. He tried to book recording time but was told he would have to wait over a year due to a long waiting list of clients. Preferring not to wait, Yoshiki bought the studio, converting it into his private recording facility and eventually renaming it Extasy Recording Studio.

In 2012, 17 Hertz LLC took over the space, restoring it and renaming it to 17 Hertz Studio.

Clients
Acts that used the facility included Metallica, Megadeth, Testament, Dream Theater, KISS, Alice in Chains, Michael Jackson, Jimi Hendrix, The Temptations, Hal David, Burt Bacharach, Dionne Warwick, Michael McDonald, Heart, Sammy Hagar, Bad English, Etta James, Aretha Franklin, Mötley Crüe, Tom Petty, Lita Ford, A Perfect Circle, Poison, Earth, Wind & Fire, Dirtyphonics, and Sullivan King.

Current independent and major Label clients of 17 Hertz Studio include Universal Music Group, Def Jam, Mo Town, Interscope, Atlantic Records, BMG Chrysalis, Warner Music Group, Sony Music, Akon, Alex Da Kid, Birdman, Bone Thugz N Harmony, Boyz II Men, CeeLo Green, Goodie Mob, Chance The Rapper, Crooks & Castles, Deezle, French Montana, Gareth Emery, Jabbawockeez, Lewis Hamilton, Mann, Mark Ronson, Prince Royce, Ray Dalton, Rita Ora, Skylar Grey, Stalley, Orgy, T.I., Tyler, The Creator, Wyclef Jean, Halsey, Lido, Papa Roach, Jeremih, Lil Yachty, Taking Back Sunday, BJ The Chicago Kid,  Zendaya, and YG.

Studio Rooms

Studio A 
17 Hertz Studio A is popular for its 2,148 sq ft Live Room, one of the largest in Los Angeles, equipped with a Yamaha C7 Grand Piano. It also includes a 414 sq ft Control Room, a private lounge and two Isolation Booths. Studio A's control room features an SSL J9080 80-channel mixing console which was acquired from Bryan Adams's The Warehouse Studio. Studio A's monitoring system is a Custom Augspurger DSP System with dual 15″ drivers, 4″ horn drivers and dual 18″ subwoofers on each side, amplified by 1,000 watts at 4ohms to each subwoofer, 500 watts at 4ohms to each 15" driver.  Equipped with Pro Tools 10 & 11 and 64 analogue inputs and outputs with four 16x16 Avid I/O's. Studio A's computer is an Apple Mac Pro "trashcan" 12 Core with 64GB of memory.

Studio B 
17 Hertz Studio B was designed by Richard Landis as an exact replica of his popular home studio, The Grey Room. It includes a spacious control room, live room, machine room and vocal booth. Now equipped with an SSL AWS 900+SE 24-channel mixing console. Dual TAD 15" drivers, Northwest horns and dual PAD 18" subwoofers on each side, amplified by JSX Audio's 6-channel amplifier and QSC Q-Sys DSP technology.

Studio C

17 Hertz Studio C is a 483 sq ft space that includes a mixing/production area, lounge and vocal booth.

Other Rooms

17 Hertz Studio also includes additional writing rooms and production spaces.

References

Recording studios in California
American companies established in 2012
Defunct companies based in Greater Los Angeles